I'll Stick to You is a 1933 British comedy film directed by Leslie S. Hiscott and starring Jay Laurier, Betty Astell, Louis Hayward and Hal Walters. It was made at Beaconsfield Studios as a quota quickie.

Cast
 Jay Laurier as Adam Tipper  
 Betty Astell as Pauline Mason  
 Louis Hayward as Ronnie Matthews  
 Ernest Sefton as Mortimer Moody  
 Hal Walters as Wilkins 
 Annie Esmond as Eve Oglethorpe
 Charles Childerstone as Pilgrim

References

Bibliography
 Low, Rachael. Filmmaking in 1930s Britain. George Allen & Unwin, 1985.
 Wood, Linda. British Films, 1927-1939. British Film Institute, 1986.

External links
 

1933 comedy films
British comedy films
1933 films
1930s English-language films
Films directed by Leslie S. Hiscott
Films shot at Beaconsfield Studios
Quota quickies
British black-and-white films
1930s British films